David J. Adelman (born March 11, 1972) is a billionaire American businessman and entrepreneur. He is the CEO of Campus Apartments, the co-founder and Chair of FS Investments and the founder of Darco Capital Chair. In October 2022, Adelman became a co-owner of the Philadelphia 76ers and New Jersey Devils.

Early life and education
Adelman was born to a Jewish family and is the grandchild of Sam Wasserman, a Holocaust survivor. He was raised in Penn Valley, Pennsylvania. Starting at the age of 11, the founder of Campus Apartments, Alan Horwitz served as a mentor to Adelman. At age 13, Adelman invested $2,000 of his Bar Mitzvah money with Horwitz and Campus Apartments. Horwitz invested those $2,000 in off-campus student housing near the University of Pennsylvania. At age 17, Adelman purchased his first solely owned investment property. Adelman attended Ohio State University and graduated with a degree in Political Science in 1994. While in college, Adelman worked in the accounting office and as a leasing agent for Campus Apartments. Adelman was accepted into the Temple University Beasley School of Law, but instead opted to become a Property Manager at Campus Apartments.

Career
In 1997, at age 25, Adelman was named the CEO of Campus Apartments after Horwitz became Chairman of Campus Apartments. As CEO of Campus Apartments, Adelman created a partnership between Campus Apartments and the University of Pennsylvania where off-campus apartments would be renovated. As a result, living standards improved and crime-rates dropped in University City. Adelman has worked to expand Campus Apartments outside of the realm of student housing at the University of Pennsylvania. Under his watch, Campus Apartments has built an extended-stay hotel and faculty condos on the University of Pennsylvania's campus and has built apartments at Franklin & Marshall College and Emory University. Adelman's guidance has resulted in Campus Apartments acquiring more than $2 billion in assets. In 2009, Adelman was named the MultiFamily Real Estate Executive of the Year. In October 2022, it was announced that Campus Apartments plans to construct a new 162,000 square foot headquarters on 41st and Walnut streets by 2026 featuring 136 new residential units and office space.

In 2007, Adelman co-founded FS Investments, a $24 Billion alternative investment firm, with headquarters in Philadelphia.

In 2013, Adelman, with group of Philadelphia-based investors, led a $30 Million investment into private aviation company Wheels Up, founded by serial entrepreneur Kenny Dichter. Adelman serves as the Lead Director. On December 19, 2019, Delta Air Lines announced it took a stake in Wheels Up to become its largest investor and merged it with its Delta Private Jets subsidiary. On January 5, 2021, Wheels Up announced its acquisition of Mountain Aviation, the 10th largest private jet charter operator in the U.S., bringing its total fleet to 350 aircraft. On February 1, 2021, Wheels Up announced a SPAC-based IPO valued at $2.1 Billion. The deal brings Wheels Up together with SPAC Aspirational Consumer Lifestyle Corp. that counts funds associated with luxury conglomerate LVMH and its boss, Bernard Arnault. It began trading in July 2021.

Adelman is also a co-founder of cred.ai, a FinTech company launched in August 2020, that uses AI to establish and improve consumers' credit.  Backed by John Legend, Ben Simmons, Tim Armstrong and Michael Rubin, cred.ai has been called the "Tesla of Banking".

In October 2020 Adelman co-led an investment into VIDE Beverages, a ready-to-drink vodka soda brand, with model, actress and entrepreneur Olivia Culpo.

On February 18, 2021, Adelman acquired a full ownership stake in American Harvest Vodka and Beach Whiskey as part of a newly formed Darco Spirits Company, under his Darco Capital umbrella.

In July 2022, it was announced that Adelman would chair 76 Devcorp, a new development company responsible for developing 76 Place at Market East, the proposed new stadium for the Philadelphia 76ers located in Center City, Philadelphia.

Philadelphia 76ers and New Jersey Devils ownership 
On October 23, 2022, Adelman acquired the majority of Michael Rubin's 10% ownership stake of the Philadelphia 76ers and New Jersey Devils. As part of the transaction, Adelman became a partner in Harris Blitzer Sports and Entertainment (HBSE), which also owns the NBA G League's Delaware Blue Coats, the AHL's Binghamton Devils and esports team Dignitas. HBSE also owns the rights to operate the Prudential Center in Newark, New Jersey.

Personal life
Adelman is an active member of the Jewish community. He is the co-founder of Jewish Federation Real Estate, Co-chair of Jewish Federation of Greater Philadelphia, Chair of the Philadelphia Holocaust Remembrance Foundation and sits on the board of the USC Shoah Foundation. He is also an active member of Har Zion Temple in Penn Valley.

Adelman spoke with Eagles wide receiver, DeSean Jackson after Jackson posted an anti-Semitic quote on Instagram that was falsely attributed to Adolf Hitler. Jackson agreed to visit the Horwitz-Wasserman Holocaust Memorial Plaza with Adelman.

He is married to children's book author and film producer, Hallee Adelman. His wife has been an executive producer on films including The Social Dilemma, The Truffle Hunters and US Kids. Most recently Hallee executive produced the Oscar-nominated documentary Writing With Fire.

Adelman has been an avid collector of wine since the early 2000s. In 2013, he began collecting tequila. In his home, he has a wine cellar, a tequila room and a "drinking room" decorated with wooden boxes from well-known wineries.

Business Insider reported Adelman's net worth at $1.6 billion, as of September 25, 2021.

References

1972 births
Living people
American chief executives
Businesspeople from Pennsylvania
Jewish American philanthropists
Ohio State University College of Arts and Sciences alumni
Philanthropists from Pennsylvania
21st-century American Jews